Georgi Palazov (born 4 February 1980 in Burgas) is a Bulgarian former swimmer, who specialized in butterfly and medley events. He represented Bulgaria at three Olympic Games – 2000 Summer Olympics in Sydney, 2004 Summer Olympics in Athens, and 2008 Summer Olympics in Beijing. Palazov achieved his best possible result at the Olympics, when he finished thirty-ninth in the men's 200 m butterfly in 2008, with a time of 2:01.84. Palazov also competed in the men's 400 m individual medley in Sydney, where he set a national record, with a time of 4:35.92, finishing only in fortieth place.

In addition to his numerous achievements at the Olympics, Palazov had also set two national records for the 100 m and 200 m butterfly events at the 2008 European Aquatics Championships in Eindhoven, Netherlands, and the other for the 50 m butterfly event at the 2004 European Aquatics Championships in Madrid, Spain.

References

External links
NBC Olympics Profile

Bulgarian male swimmers
Living people
Olympic swimmers of Bulgaria
Swimmers at the 2000 Summer Olympics
Swimmers at the 2004 Summer Olympics
Swimmers at the 2008 Summer Olympics
Male butterfly swimmers
Male medley swimmers
Sportspeople from Burgas
1980 births
20th-century Bulgarian people
21st-century Bulgarian people